Richard Holderness may refer to:

Richard Wood, Baron Holderness
Sir Richard William Holderness, 3rd Baronet (1927–1998) of the Holderness baronets